Douglass Residential College, is an undergraduate, non degree granting higher education program of Rutgers University-New Brunswick for women. It succeeded the liberal arts degree-granting Douglass College after it was merged with the other undergraduate liberal arts colleges at Rutgers-New Brunswick to form the School of Arts and Sciences in 2007. Originally named the New Jersey College for Women when founded in 1918 as a degree granting college, it was renamed Douglass College in 1955 in honor of its first dean. The program now called Douglass Residential College is no longer a degree granting unit of Rutgers, but is a supplementary program that female undergraduate students attending the Rutgers-New Brunswick undergraduate schools may choose to join.
Female students enrolled at any of the academic undergraduate schools at Rutgers–New Brunswick, including, e.g., the School of Arts and Sciences, School of Engineering, School of Environmental and Biological Sciences, School of Pharmacy, Mason Gross School of the Arts, may now also enroll in Douglass Residential College, which offers special enrichment and career preparation experiences, special projects, and educational and service travel, and at which they must satisfy additional requirements specific to the college. Douglass seeks to provide the benefits of a close-knit small community of women students and offers programs specially designed to help women students to identify their unique abilities and develop confidence. These programs include, for example, a strong emphasis on opportunities to participate in service/learning trips in foreign countries, support for and expansion of racial and cultural diversity, and a wide range of training and enrichment activities offered by a career and leadership development center known as the "BOLD" Center (acronym for Building Opportunities for Leadership and Career Development).

Deans
 Mabel Smith Douglass (1918–1932): A graduate of Barnard College, Mabel Smith Douglass was a leader of the New Jersey State Federation of Women's Clubs.
 Margaret Trumbull Corwin (1934–1955): A graduate of Bryn Mawr with a master's degree from Yale. It was during Dean Corwin’s tenure that the New Jersey College for Women became Douglass College.
 Mary Bunting (1955–1960): A graduate of Vassar with advanced degrees in microbiology from the University of Wisconsin. She resigned to become president of Radcliffe.
 Ruth Marie Adams (1960–1966): An Adelphi graduate with a doctorate in English from Radcliffe. She resigned to become president of Wellesley.
 Margery Somers Foster (1967–1975): A graduate of Wellesley with a doctorate in economics from Radcliffe.
 Jewel Plummer Cobb (1976–1981): A graduate of Talladega College in Alabama with advanced degrees in cell biology from New York University. She resigned to become president of California State University at Fullerton.
 Mary S. Hartman (1982–1994): A graduate of Swarthmore with an M.A. and Ph.D. from Columbia University in history, Mary S. Hartman became a member of the Douglass History Department in 1968 (Institute for Women’s Leadership, 2004, p. 1). She served as director of the Women’s Studies Institute from 1975 to 1977, was named acting dean in 1981, and dean in 1982. She resigned to become director of the Institute for Women’s Leadership at Rutgers University.
 Barbara A. Shailor (1996–2001): A graduate of Wilson College with a master's degree and doctorate in classics from the University of Cincinnati. She resigned to become Director of the Beinecke Rare Book and Manuscript Library at Yale University. She was appointed the Deputy Provost for the Arts at Yale University in 2003.
 Carmen Twillie Ambar (2002–2008):  A graduate of the Edmund A. Walsh School of Foreign Service at Georgetown University, Carmen Twillie Ambar earned a law degree from Columbia School of Law and a master’s in public affairs from the Woodrow Wilson School of Public and International Affairs at Princeton University. In 2008, Ambar resigned to become president of Cedar Crest College in Allentown, PA, and in 2017 she became President of Oberlin College..
 Jacquelyn S. Litt (2010–2022): A graduate of William Smith College with an M.A. and Ph.D. in sociology from University of Pennsylvania. Litt will continue working at Rutgers as professor of sociology and women's studies in the Rutgers School of Arts and Sciences in New Brunswick.

Notable alumnae and year of graduation

 Alice Aycock DC'68: Sculptor
 Catherine H. Bailey NJC '42: plant geneticist
 Cheri Beasley DC'88: Chief Justice, North Carolina Supreme Court  
 Leonie Brinkema DC'65: Judge, U.S. District Court, E.D. Va.
 Elise M. Boulding NJCW'40: Peace activist, sociologist
 Elizabeth Cavanna Harrison  NJCW'29: (known as Betty Cavanna and also used names Elizabeth Headley and Betsy Allen) children's book author
 Carol T. Christ DC'66: former President, Smith College, current Chancellor of University of California, Berkeley

 Janet Evanovich DC'65: author
 Jeanne Fox DC'74: Former president, New Jersey Board of Public Utilities

 Helen Hall Jennings NJCW'27: American scientist in the fields of psychology and sociology
 Wilma Harris DC'66: associate dean, Douglass College; vice pres. human resources Prudential; NJ state financial assistance board in Byrne, Florio, and Whitman administrations
 Jaynee LaVecchia DC'76: New Jersey Supreme Court Justice

 Susan Martin DC'68: retired Georgetown University professor, expert on international migrations
 Imbolo Mbue DC'02: Novelist
 Janet L. Norwood DC'45: economist, US Commissioner of Labor Statistics (1979–1991)
 Judith Shatin DC'71: composer
 Joann H. Smith NJC or DC?, politician who served in the New Jersey General Assembly from the 13th Legislative District
 Kathleen C. Taylor, DC'64, award-winning chemist and automotive engineer
 Freda L. Wolfson DC'76: Judge, U.S. District Court, D. N.J.

References

External links 
Official Website

Rutgers University
Educational institutions established in 1918
1918 establishments in New Jersey
Residential colleges